Moustapha Alassane (1942–17 March 2015) was a Nigerien filmmaker.

Biography

Born in 1942 in N’Dougou (Niger), Moustapha Alassane graduated in mechanics. However, in the Rouch IRSH in Niamey he learned the cinematographic technique and thereafter became one of its main proponents. Jean Rouch provided for Alassane’s education and accommodation in Canada, where he met the famous Norman McLaren, who taught him about animation.

He was the creator of the first animated films of the sub-Saharan Africa, also directing documentaries and fiction films. He was Head of Cinema Department at the Niamey University for 15 years.

Moustapha Alassane directed, in 1962, two shorts inspired in traditional tales: Aoure and La Bague du roi Koda. Representing African culture (e.g. in Deela ou el Barka le conteur, 1969 and Shaki, 1973), Alassane also employed moral satire (F.V.V.A., femme, villa, voiture, argent, 1972), denouncing the thirst for power for “new wealth” in Africa. Social criticism and black humour are in almost all of his films. The frog was his favourite animal and protagonist of most of his animated films, because Alassane believed it is funnier to animate frogs rather than humans.

His workshop was based in Tahoua. To work, Alassane used several materials, such as wood, metal or wire, glue, fabric or sponge.

Numerous retrospectives of Alassane’s career have been made in several international film festivals.

Moustapha Alassane was made a Knight of the Legion of Honour at the Cannes Film Festival in 2007.

Filmography

As director
1962: La Bague du roi Koda
1962: Aoure
1962: La Pileuse de Mil
1962: Le piroguier
1963: La mort du Gandji
1964: L’arachide de Santchira
1966: Le Retour d'un aventurier
1966: Bon voyage Sim
1967: Malbaza
1969: Les contre Bandiers
1970: Deela ou Albarka
1970: Bon Voyage Sim
1971: Jamyya
1972: Women Cars Villas Money a.k.a. F.V.V.A.: Femme, Voiture, Villa, Argent
1972: Abimbola ou Shaki
1973: Siberi
1974: Soubane
1974: Toula ou Le génie des eaux
1975: Zaboa
1977: Samba the Great
1982: Agwane mon Village
1982: Kankamba ou le semeur de discorde
1982: Gourimou
2000: Soolo
2000: Adieu Sim
2001: Les magiciens de l'Ader
2001: Agaïssa
2001: Kokoa
2003: Tagimba

As actor
1971: Petit à petit (Moustaphe)
1976: L'Étoile noire

As writer
1974: Toula ou Le génie des eaux

Films about Moustapha Alassane
Animation et creation: Univers du cinema de Moustapha Alassane (2002), documentary directed by Debra S. Boyd
Moustapha Alassane, cinéaste du possible (2009), documentary directed by Silvia Bazzoli and Christian Lelong.

References

External links

Moustapha Alassane in ClapNoir (French)
Moustapha Alassane in Africultures (French)
Moustapha Alassane in African Success
Moustapha Alassane in a "La Gazette" article (French)
Le Retour D'Un Aventurier and Moustapha Alassane in the 5th "Festival des Cinémas Africains" (French)
Moustapha Alassane invited to the 2nd Edition of "Festival culturel panafricain" (Panaf) (French)

1942 births
2015 deaths
Chevaliers of the Légion d'honneur
Nigerien film directors